Giacomo Carduini (died 1506) was a Roman Catholic prelate who served as Bishop of Lipari (1489–1506).

Biography
On 9 October 1489, Giacomo Carduini was appointed during the papacy of Pope Innocent VIII as Bishop of Lipari.
He served as Bishop of Lipari until his death in 1506.

See also 
Catholic Church in Italy

References

External links and additional sources
 (for Chronology of Bishops) 
 (for Chronology of Bishops) 

15th-century Italian Roman Catholic bishops
16th-century Italian Roman Catholic bishops
Bishops appointed by Pope Innocent VIII
1506 deaths